Talla N'Diaye (born 20 January 1993) is a Senegalese professional footballer who plays as a forward for Egyptian club Tala'ea El Gaish.

Honours 
Individual
 Lebanese Premier League top assist provider: 2016–17

References

External links
 
 Talla N'Diaye at Footballdatabase

1985 births
Living people
Senegalese footballers
Association football forwards
Safa SC players
Al Ansar FC players
Tala'ea El Gaish SC players
Lebanese Premier League players
Senegalese expatriate footballers
Senegalese expatriate sportspeople in France
Expatriate footballers in France
Senegalese expatriate sportspeople in Lebanon
Expatriate footballers in Lebanon
Senegalese expatriate sportspeople in Egypt
Expatriate footballers in Egypt
Championnat National 2 players
Championnat National 3 players
Egyptian Premier League players